The 2008 Kilkenny Senior Hurling Championship was the 114th staging of the Kilkenny Senior Hurling Championship since its establishment by the Kilkenny County Board in 1887. The championship began on 20 September 2008 and ended on 26 October 2008.

Ballyhale Shamrocks were the defending champions.

On 4 October 2008, Dicksboro were relegated from the championship following 2–11 to 1–11 defeat by Young Irelands.

On 26 October 2008, Ballyhale Shamrocks won the championship after a 2–11 to 0–12 defeat of James Stephens in the final. It was their 12th championship title overall and their third title in succession.

Henry Shefflin from the Ballyhale Shamrocks club was the championship's top scorer with 1-23.

Team changes

To Championship

Promoted from the Kilkenny Intermediate Hurling Championship
 Clara

From Championship

Relegated to the Kilkenny Intermediate Hurling Championship
 Mullinavat

Results

First round

Relegation play-off

Quarter-finals

Semi-finals

Final

Championship statistics

Top scorers

Top scorers overall

Top scorers in a single game

References

External links
2008 Kilkenny SHC results

Kilkenny Senior Hurling Championship
Kilkenny